Dichomeris cocta is a moth in the family Gelechiidae. It was described by Edward Meyrick in 1913. It is found in Assam, India.

The forewings are ochreous fuscous, the costal edge suffused with yellow ochreous. The stigmata are dark fuscous, the discal approximated, the plical obliquely before the first discal. There are some dark fuscous dots around the posterior part of the costa and termen. The hindwings are grey.

References

Moths described in 1913
cocta